Hypatopa texla is a moth in the family Blastobasidae. It is found in Costa Rica.

The length of the forewings is about 7.6 mm. The forewings are pale brown intermixed with a few brown scales. The hindwings are translucent pale brown.

Etymology
The specific name is derived from Latin tela (meaning "that which is woven").

References

Moths described in 2013
Hypatopa